Eva Russo (born 20 December 1966) is an Italian actress and former international football goalkeeper.

Russo had 57 caps for the Italy women's national football team in December 1989 when she failed a drugs test ahead of a match with Switzerland and received a six-month suspension.

While playing for Lazio, she was engaged to the male Lazio footballer Francesco Dell'Anno. The engagement broke off after four years. Russo also worked as an actress.

Honours

Club 
Lazio
 Serie A (2): 1980, 1987–88
 Coppa Italia (1): 1985

Milan Salvarani
 Serie A (1): 1991–92

International 
Italy
 UEFA Women's Championship Third place: 1987
 Mundialito (2): 1984, 1986

Filmography

Film

Television

References

External links 

1966 births
Living people
Italian women's footballers
Italy women's international footballers
Italian sportspeople in doping cases
Doping cases in association football
Footballers from Rome
Serie A (women's football) players
S.S. Lazio Women 2015 players
Actresses from Rome
20th-century Italian actresses
Italian film actresses
Italian television actresses
Association footballers' wives and girlfriends
Women's association football goalkeepers
A.C.F. Prato players